Dorylaimidae is a family of nematodes, belonging to the order Dorylaimida.

Genera

Genera:
 Afrodorylaimus Andrássy, 1964
 Amphidorylaimus Andrássy, 1960
 Anadorella Siddiqi, 2005

References

Nematodes